Ronald Augustine Hoy (13 August 1932 – 15 July 2016) was an Australian rules footballer who played with Hawthorn in the Victorian Football League (VFL).

Hoy spent most of his career at South Warrnambool, but had a stint with Norwood in 1952. He came down to Melbourne and played one VFL game for Hawthorn in 1955, their round 10 win over St Kilda at Glenferrie Oval.

He was the first player in the history of the Hampden Football League to win three Maskell Medals. He took home the award in 1954, 1955 and 1957.

Hoy died at Warrnambool in 2016.

References

1932 births
Australian rules footballers from Victoria (Australia)
Hawthorn Football Club players
Norwood Football Club players
South Warrnambool Football Club players
2016 deaths